The Armenian Catholic Archeparchy of Baghdad is a non-metropolitan Archeparchy (Eastern Catholic archdiocese) of the Armenian Catholic Church, covering Iraq.

It is directly dependent of the Armenian Catholic Patriarch of Cilicia, but not part of his Metropolitan ecclesiastical province.

Its cathedral episcopal see is the Cathedral of Our Lady of Nareg, in the Iraqi national capital Baghdad, after which the archeparchy s colloquially known as Baghdad of the Armenians.

History 
It was established on 29 June 1954, on territory split off from the (now titular) Armenian Catholic Archeparchy of Mardin (which simultaneously lost territory to establish the Eparchy of Kameshli (Al-Qamishli, in Syria), and was itself suppressed in 1972), whose Eparch was transferred to the Baghdad daughter see.

Episcopal ordinaries
Non-Metropolitan Archeparchs (Archbishops) of Baghdad of the Armenians.
 Nersès Tayroyan (1954.06.29 – 1972.10.01), previously Archbishop of mother archeparchy Mardin of the Armenians (1940.05.03 – 1954.06.29), emeritate as Titular Archbishop of Melitene of the Armenians (1972.10.01 – death 1986.08.04)
 Hovhannes Kasparian, I.C.P.B. (1972.12.06 – 1982.08.05), later Patriarch of Cilicia of the Armenians (Lebanon) ([1982.08.05] 1982.08.07 – 1999.09.08), President of Synod of the Armenian Catholic Church (1982.08.07 – 1999.09.08)
 Paul Coussa (1983.06.27 – retired 2001.10.13), previously Titular Archbishop of Colonia in Armenia of the Armenians (1969.08.26 – 1983.06.27) & Patriarchal Exarch of Syria of the Armenians (Syria) (1969.08.26 – 1983.06.27)
'' Apostolic Administrator Andon Atamian (2001–2006)
 Emmanuel Dabbaghian, I.C.P.B. (2007.01.26 – 2017)

See also 
 Catholic Church in Iraq

References

External links 
 GigaCatholic with incumbent biography links

Christian organizations established in 1954
Armenian Catholic eparchies
Armenian Catholic Church in Iraq